The Plymouth & Brockton Street Railway Co., commonly referred to as Plymouth & Brockton or simply P&B, is a private regional bus transportation company operating in Eastern Massachusetts. The company primarily operates a few routes connecting Boston with suburban communities of Southeastern Massachusetts and Cape Cod.

History

The P&B was established in 1888 as a trolley company in Plymouth and Kingston, Massachusetts. At its height, trolleys operated as far as Pembroke and Sagamore Beach. The company operated trolleys up until 1928, when they switched to solely operating buses in and around the South Shore.

Due to the COVID-19 pandemic in the United States, the company suspended all service from March 24, 2020, until May 14, 2021. The company received a federal Paycheck Protection Program loan.

Operations

P&B primarily operates four different lines. The first is the mainline, connecting Hyannis, Massachusetts and Boston Logan International Airport, which operates up to 29 times daily. This route is primarily used by commuters and travelers to the airport in a park and ride manner.

Stops

The following table details a list of Plymouth & Brockton stops for their scheduled regional service. Note that not all stations are served at all times.

References

External links
 Plymouth & Brockton Site

Bus transportation in Massachusetts
Bus transportation in the Boston area